Angela Lee Murnane (born 13 April 1983) is a former Australian cricketer. She is a right-handed batter and a right-arm medium pace bowler. Born in Brisbane, Queensland, she represented her home state in 22 List A matches in the Women's National Cricket League (WNCL) between the 2003–04 and 2008–09 seasons.

References

External links
 
 

1983 births
Living people
Australian cricketers
Australian women cricketers
Cricketers from Brisbane
Sportswomen from Queensland
Queensland Fire cricketers